Paddy Kirwan may refer to:

 Paddy Kirwan (hurler), Irish hurler
 Paddy Kirwan (Gaelic footballer) (1899–1963), Irish Gaelic footballer